Saint Ignatius Brianchaninov (born Dmitry Alexandrovich Brianchaninov; ; 15 February 1807 – 30 April 1867) was a bishop and theologian of the Russian Orthodox Church. He stands out as one of the greatest Eastern Orthodox patristic writers of the nineteenth century.

He was glorified (canonized) as a saint by the 1988 meeting of the Local Council of the Russian Orthodox Church. His relics are preserved at the ancient Tolga Monastery on the Volga River near Yaroslavl.

Life and work 

Dmitry Bryanchaninov was born in the manor of Pokrovskoye to one of the wealthiest landowning families of the Governorate of Vologda. He was educated at Main Military Engineering School in St. Petersburg.

Although successful in his studies, he was deeply dissatisfied with the lay life and turned to a life of prayer. In 1827 he fell seriously ill and left the army on this ground. He began pursuing a monastic vocation and in 1831 took monastic vows and received the monastic name of Ignatius. He was ordained a priest shortly afterwards. He rose rapidly to the rank of archimandrite and at the age of 26 was appointed superior of the Maritime Monastery of St. Sergius in St. Petersburg. In 1857, Ignatius was consecrated Bishop of the Caucasus and the Black Sea, but he retired only four years later to the Nikolo-Babayevsky Monastery on the Volga to devote himself to spiritual writing.

He wrote a large amount of material, mostly about the spiritual life and prayer. Only a small portion of his writing has been translated into English. Although his writing was intended primarily for monks, his works are highly recommended for lay Christians by leading Orthodox figures such as Father Thomas Hopko.

Books 
Available in English translation:
 The Arena: An Offering to Contemporary Monasticism. Brianchaninov, I. Translated by Arch. Lazarus. Holy Trinity Monastery, 1997. 
 The Field: Cultivating Salvation. Complete works of St. Ignatius Brianchaninov, Vol. I. Translated by Nicholas Kotar. Holy Trinity Monastery, 2016. 
 On the Prayer of Jesus. Brianchaninov, I. Translated by Arch. Lazarus. Ibis Press, 2006. 
 The Refuge: Anchoring the Soul in God. Complete works of St. Ignatius Brianchaninov, Vol. II. Translated by Nicholas Kotar. Holy Trinity Monastery, 2019.

Quotes
 He who is careless about prayer is careless about his salvation; he who quits prayer renounces his salvation.
 Worldly people and even monks without spiritual discernment are nearly always attracted by humbugs, imposters, hypocrites and those who are in demonic delusion, and they take them for saints and genuine servants of God.

References

External links

Complete work of Ignatius Brianchaninov in Russian
Ignatius Brianchaninov article from OrthodoxWiki
Champion of the Arena - Bishop Ignatius Brianchaninov article from Orthodox America
The Act of Canonization of the Local Council of the Russian Orthodox Church Trinity-Sergius Laura, 6–9 June 1988 
  

1807 births
1867 deaths
People from Gryazovetsky District
People from Gryazovetsky Uyezd
Russian saints of the Eastern Orthodox Church
Bishops of the Russian Orthodox Church
Russian theologians
19th-century Eastern Orthodox bishops
Military Engineering-Technical University alumni
19th-century Eastern Orthodox theologians
Translators of the Philokalia